Dienbienia namnuaensis is a species of loach endemic to Vietnam. It is the only member of its genus.

References

Balitoridae
Monotypic fish genera
Fish of Asia